Newport was a rural district in Shropshire, England from 1894 to 1934.

It was formed under the Local Government Act 1894 from that part of the Newport rural sanitary district which was in Shropshire (the rest, in Staffordshire, forming the Gnosall Rural District.)

It was abolished in 1934 under a County Review Order, and was merged into the Wellington Rural District.

References
http://www.visionofbritain.org.uk/relationships.jsp?u_id=10216928

History of Shropshire
Local government in Shropshire
Newport, Shropshire
Districts of England created by the Local Government Act 1894
Rural districts of England